Kobamelo Kodisang (born 28 August 1999) is a South African professional soccer player who plays as a forward for Portuguese club Moreirense on loan from Braga. He became one of the youngest players to ever play in the Premier Soccer League when he made his debut at the age of 15 in August 2015.

Club career
Born in the small town of Seraleng (near Rustenburg), Kodisang was first discovered at the age of ten by Cavin Johnson, then-manager of Platinum Stars. He joined the youth team shortly after, and initially received media attention after an impressive performance at the 2014/15 MultiChoice Diski Challenge tournament, including scoring two goals to lead his team to a comeback win against Orlando Pirates.

He was called up to the senior squad for the 2015–16 season, and made his professional debut on 26 August 2015, replacing Robert Ng'ambi after the 85th minute of a 2-0 win against Golden Arrows. At the age of 15 years, 363 days, he became one of the youngest players to ever play in the Premier Soccer League, and the youngest in the past six years.

Kodisang was signed by Portuguese club Sanjoanense on 28 September 2018 on a season-long loan deal. In mid-August 2019, he joined S.C. Braga B.

On 2 August 2022, Kodisang joined Moreirense in Liga Portugal 2 on a season-long loan, with an option to buy.

International career
Kodisang was selected to represent the South African national under-17 team at the 2015 FIFA U-17 World Cup in Chile, and played in all three matches (against Costa Rica, North Korea and Russia). South Africa, however, got eliminated in the group stage with a record of one draw, two losses.

References

External links

 
 
 Kobamelo Kodisang at AD Sanjoanense

1999 births
People from Rustenburg Local Municipality
Living people
South African soccer players
South Africa youth international soccer players
South Africa under-20 international soccer players
Olympic soccer players of South Africa
Association football forwards
Platinum Stars F.C. players
Bidvest Wits F.C. players
A.D. Sanjoanense players
S.C. Braga B players
S.C. Braga players
Moreirense F.C. players
South African Premier Division players
Campeonato de Portugal (league) players
Primeira Liga players
Liga Portugal 2 players
Footballers at the 2020 Summer Olympics
South African expatriate soccer players
South African expatriate sportspeople in Portugal
Expatriate footballers in Portugal